Meyrickella is a genus of moths of the family Erebidae. The genus was erected by Carlos Berg in 1898.

Species
 Meyrickella ruptellus Walker, 1863
 Meyrickella torquesauria Lucas, 1892

References

Calpinae
Moth genera